Dieudonné Bogmis (12 January 1955 – 25 August 2018) was a Cameroonian Roman Catholic bishop.

Born in Cameroon, Bogmis was ordained to the priesthood in 1983. He served as auxiliary bishop of the Roman Catholic Archdiocese of Douala, Cameroon and as titular bishop of Gadiaufala from 1999 to 2004. He then served as bishop of the Roman Catholic Diocese of Eséka, Cameroon from 2004 until his death in 2018 due to a stroke.

Notes

1955 births
2018 deaths
21st-century Roman Catholic bishops in Cameroon
Roman Catholic bishops of Eséka
Roman Catholic bishops of Douala